The 1990 480 km of Silverstone was the third round of the 1990 World Sportscar Championship season, taking place at Silverstone Circuit, United Kingdom.  It took place on May 20, 1990.

Official results
Class winners in bold.  Cars failing to complete 75% of the winner's distance marked as Not Classified (NC).

† - #24 Nissan Motorsports Intl. and #20 Team Davey were listed as not classified due to taking too long to complete the final race lap.

‡ - #2 Team Sauber Mercedes had its qualifying times disallowed for receiving outside assistance while on the track during the qualifying session.

Statistics
 Pole Position - Jean-Louis Schlesser (#1 Team Sauber Mercedes) - 1:12.073
 Fastest Lap - Jean-Louis Schlesser (#1 Team Sauber Mercedes) - 1:16.649
 Average Speed - 207.413 km/h

References

External links
 WSPR-Racing - 1990 Silverstone results

Silverstone
Silverstone
6 Hours of Silverstone
May 1990 sports events in the United Kingdom